Cayuga East Aerodrome  is  east northeast of Cayuga, Ontario, Canada.

References

Registered aerodromes in Ontario